"What's Up With That" is a 1996 ZZ Top song and single from the album Rhythmeen.

The single was a deliberate return to ZZ Top's blues roots, dropping the synthesizers and back to guitar. The harmonica was played by James Harman. The single features two unreleased live recordings that were captured "live and sly" during one of the many ZZ Top late nights. The first live song is a cover song by 1930s blues musician Robert Johnson, that song was only played live during the 1996 Continental Safari Tour. The second song is originally from their 1975 album Fandango!.

Track listing

Charts

Weekly charts

Year-end charts

Personnel
Billy Gibbons-guitar, lead vocals
Dusty Hill- bass guitar, backing vocals
Frank Beard-drums

Additional musicians
James Harman-harmonica

References

ZZ Top songs
1996 singles
Songs written by Billy Gibbons
1996 songs
Songs written by Mack Rice
Songs written by Luther Ingram
Song recordings produced by Bill Ham